CHRC may refer to:

 CHRC-FM, a radio station (92.5 FM) in Clarence-Rockland, Ontario, Canada
 CHRC (defunct), a defunct radio station (800 AM) licensed to Quebec City, Quebec, Canada
 Canadian Human Rights Commission
Chaparral Railroad